Michal Belej (born 16 November 1982) is a Czech futsal player and former footballer who plays for Tango Brno and the Czech Republic national futsal team. In his time as a footballer, he played for Brno in midfield.

References

External links
 
 UEFA profile

1982 births
Living people
Czech footballers
Association football midfielders
Czech First League players
FC Zbrojovka Brno players
SK Dynamo České Budějovice players
FC Dosta Bystrc-Kníničky players
Czech men's futsal players
People from Jevíčko
Sportspeople from the Pardubice Region